John Edward Sununu (born September 10, 1964) is an American politician who served as a member of the United States House of Representatives and United States Senator from New Hampshire. Sununu was the youngest member of the Senate for his entire six-year term. He is the only Salvadoran American ever elected to the U.S. Congress. He is the son of former New Hampshire Governor and former White House Chief of Staff John H. Sununu. In 2008, Sununu lost his re-election bid to former governor Jeanne Shaheen. His younger brother, Chris Sununu, has been the Governor of New Hampshire since January 2017.

Early life and education
Sununu, one of eight siblings, was born in Boston, Massachusetts, the son of Nancy (née Hayes) and former Governor of New Hampshire and White House Chief of Staff John H. Sununu.

His father's paternal ancestors came to the United States from the Middle East around the start of the 20th century, while his paternal grandmother was an immigrant from El Salvador, born to a prominent Salvadoran family of Lebanese, Hispanic and Greek descent who were Greek Orthodox Christians. His father's paternal ancestry is Lebanese and Greek, both from the Greek Orthodox communities in Jerusalem. Despite the family's emigration from Jerusalem, some members of the family were from Beirut. His father's maternal ancestry was Greek and Hispanic. His father, John, was born in Havana, Cuba. His paternal grandfather, also named John, was born in the United States, and most of the last two generations of Sununus were also born in the United States. His mother's ancestors include immigrants from Ireland, as well as Scotland and England.

Sununu earned both B.S. and M.S. degrees in mechanical engineering from the Massachusetts Institute of Technology in 1986 and 1987, respectively. He earned a Master of Business Administration from Harvard University in 1991. After graduating, he worked in the high-tech industry, at one time for the company of Dean Kamen and as a management consultant for PRTM.

U.S. House of Representatives

Elections
In 1996, incumbent Republican U.S. Congressman Bill Zeliff decided to run for Governor of New Hampshire. Sununu narrowly defeated Democrat Joe Keefe. In 1998, he won re-election with 67% of the vote beating Democrat Peter Flood. In 2000, he won re-election defeating Democrat Martha Fuller Clark with 53% of the vote.

Tenure
In 1999, New Hampshire's Christian Coalition gave "pro-family" awards to both New Hampshire Representatives, Sununu and Charles Bass, honoring the vote by both men to impeach President Bill Clinton.

On November 8, 2000, the Boston Globe noted Sununu's defeat of Democratic newcomer Martha Fuller Clark, noting that Sununu had "one of the House's most conservative voting records"—opposing abortion and increased minimum wages while favoring school vouchers and the death penalty. He earned a 100% rating from the Council for Citizens Against Government Waste. He has also been presented the "Spirit of Enterprise Award" by the U.S. Chamber of Commerce, the "Guardian of Small Business Award" by the National Federation of Independent Business, and the "Friend of the Taxpayer Award" by the Americans for Tax Reform.

Committee assignments
He served on the House Appropriations and Budget Committees. He held subcommittee seats on the Veterans Administration-Housing and Urban Development Subcommittee, the Treasury Postal Subcommittee, and the District of Columbia Appropriations Subcommittee, and also served as a member of the Republican Policy Committee.

U.S. Senate

Elections

2002

In 2002, Sununu ran for a United States Senate seat from New Hampshire. In the Republican primary, he defeated the Republican incumbent Bob Smith 54%–45%. In the November election, he subsequently defeated Democratic Governor Jeanne Shaheen 51%–46%. The election was marred by members of the Republican Party who organized the 2002 New Hampshire Senate election phone jamming scandal which disrupted Democratic efforts.

2008

In a rematch, Shaheen defeated Sununu 52% to 45%. She won every county but Carroll, Belknap, and Rockingham counties. Sununu slightly outperformed Republican presidential candidate John McCain in the 2008 national election, as McCain got about 45% of the vote but did not win any counties.

Tenure

According to a Washington Post study, Sununu voted with the Republican Party's position 84% of the time. However, he broke with his party on prominent issues, joining Democrats in filibusters of the USA PATRIOT Act and the Bush Administration's 2003 energy bill. Sununu strongly supported greater access to firearms, voting against the proposed renewal of the 1994 Federal Assault Weapons Ban in 2004. In 2006, he voted against the Federal Marriage Amendment, a proposed constitutional amendment to ban gay marriage. He strongly opposed amnesty for illegal aliens, voting against the McCain-Kennedy immigration bill in July 2007. Sununu called for a tougher federal regulator for government-sponsored enterprises Fannie Mae and Freddie Mac, and with Senator Tim Johnson (D-SD), he filed a dramatic overhaul of regulation of the insurance industry. A long proponent of technology, in January 2007, Sununu called for a permanent ban on taxes of Internet connections and online sales.

The non-partisan National Journal gave Sununu a composite rating of 65.8% conservative and 34% liberal in 2008. Sununu was one of only three senators whose voting record received a score of 100% from the fiscally conservative Club for Growth, in both 2005 and 2006, tying for 1st place. However, his rating fell to 23rd place in 2007, and to 34th place in 2008. The Club for Growth endorsed Sununu's unsuccessful bid for re-election in February 2007 against Jeanne Shaheen (she subsequently during 2009–2012 earned Club for Growth ratings of 64th place to 100th place).

In 2007, Sununu was the lead Republican co-sponsor of the Clean Air Planning Act of 2007 which sought to address air quality and climate change by establishing a schedule to reduce harmful emissions from power plants—in particular, sulfur dioxide and nitrogen oxides—as well as decrease carbon dioxide emissions through a cap and trade system. The legislation, which was never enacted, also addressed mercury pollution, calling for a 90% reduction in emissions of the chemical by 2015. He also supported the bipartisan Clean Energy Stimulus Act of 2008 that provides tax incentives for the development of clean and renewable energy sources. In 2006 Sununu sponsored the bipartisan New England Wilderness Act which added tens of thousand of acres of land to federally protected forests. Sununu opposed the Climate Stewardship Act of 2003, which would have also created a cap-and-trade program. His vote was criticized by the New Hampshire Democratic Party which claimed that he had acted "against reducing greenhouse gases". The New Hampshire Union Leader praised his decision, citing the Energy Information Agency's estimation that the legislation would cost the American economy $507 billion over 22 years.

Sununu took a few positions contrary to the Bush administration and the Republican leadership. Though he voted for the flag-burning amendment, he voted against the Federal Marriage Amendment and he opposed restrictions on travel and trade with Cuba, and was one of only two Republicans to vote in favor of terminating funds for TV Martí, which broadcasts anti-Castro programming in Cuba. He was one of a small group of Republicans to vote in favor of banning loans to China for any nuclear projects, and in September 2005 he voted to disapprove a new rule set in place by the Administrator of the Environmental Protection Agency (EPA) delisting coal and other energy sources from the Clean Air Act.

He also became well known as one of the five Republican Senators who joined Democrats in a filibuster of the USA PATRIOT Act renewal conference report, concerned about possible negative impacts the bill had on civil liberties. This caused the Republican leadership to extend the original legislation until a compromise bill was forged.

In January 2006, at a hearing in front of the Commerce, Science and Transportation Committee on the Broadcast Flag, Sununu was one of the very few present to criticize the legislation, saying "In all cases [of previous technological advancements in the US], we didn't need to step in with a significant statutory government-regulated mandate on technology that consumers use to enjoy this material".

In October 2006, Sununu voted against a portion of the Military Commissions Act of 2006 that would suspend the right of habeas corpus for non-citizen detainees. After voting in favor of the final bill, he defended his vote by telling reporters "The Constitution is not a suicide pact".

On March 14, 2007, Sununu became the first Republican senator to call for the firing of Attorney General Alberto Gonzales after a controversy over U.S. Attorney firings. Sununu cited his anger with the mismanagement by Gonzales and the lack of trustworthiness by GOP Senators towards Gonzales.

In July 2005, Sununu shaved his head to show solidarity with Senator Arlen Specter, who had lost his hair due to chemotherapy for Hodgkin's disease.

In September 2008, Sununu became one of twenty senators (ten Democrats and ten Republicans) co-sponsoring a bipartisan energy bill, the New Energy Reform Act of 2008. The bill was offered as an alternative to the Democrats' energy bill, sponsored by House Speaker Nancy Pelosi. Both bills proposed to increase offshore drilling, while promoting conservation and alternative energy. The "Gang of Twenty" bill also lets coastal states participate in decisions and in revenue about drilling in the fifty-to-one-hundred-mile range off their coasts. It also differs from the Democrats' bill in allowing drilling off Florida's west coast, a proposal both Florida's senators have protested. To quote the Minneapolis Star Tribune, "Nearly every potentially vulnerable Senate Republican, from Norm Coleman [of Minnesota] to Elizabeth Dole of North Carolina and John Sununu of New Hampshire, has signed on to the legislation."

Committee assignments
 Committee on Finance
 Committee on Commerce, Science, and Transportation
 Subcommittee on Aviation Operations, Safety, and Security
 Subcommittee on Interstate Commerce, Trade, and Tourism
 Subcommittee on Oceans, Atmosphere, Fisheries, and Coast Guard
 Subcommittee on Science, Technology, and Innovation
 Subcommittee on Space, Aeronautics, and Related Agencies
 Committee on Homeland Security and Governmental Affairs
 Ad Hoc Subcommittee on State, Local, and Private Sector Preparedness and Integration (Ranking Member)
 Permanent Subcommittee on Investigations
 Subcommittee on Federal Financial Management, Government Information, Federal Services, and International Security
 Joint Economic Committee

Later career
Sununu currently sits on the Board of Managers of ConvergEx Holdings, a holding company for BNY ConvergEx Group, an affiliate of Bank of New York Mellon, which holds a 33.8% stake in BNY ConvergEx Group.

On July 7, 2010, Akin Gump Strauss Hauer & Feld LLP announced that Sununu was joining the firm as an adjunct senior policy advisor. Akin Gump is one of the largest law firms and lobbying firms in Washington, D.C.

Sununu was appointed by Senate Minority Leader Mitch McConnell to serve on the Congressional Oversight Panel (COP) for the Troubled Asset Relief Program funds, whose purpose is to assess how the TARP program is working, in order to help Congress determine whether to continue injecting capital into the financial sector.

Sununu is a regular op-ed contributor to the Boston Globe.

Prior to the 2014 election cycle, speculation had abounded that he would pursue a rematch against Shaheen, but in April 2013, he said that he would not run for his old seat.

On January 30, 2019, Lloyd's of London announced Sununu had been appointed to its governing council.

Personal life
Sununu married Catherine (Kitty) Halloran on July 9, 1988. They have three children: John, (Catherine) Grace, and Charlotte.

Electoral history

*Write-in and minor candidate notes: In 2002, write-ins received 197 votes.

See also
List of Arab and Middle-Eastern Americans in the United States Congress
List of Hispanic and Latino Americans in the United States Congress
List of Greek Americans

References

External links

 
 

|-

|-

|-

|-

1964 births
American people of Arab descent
21st-century American politicians
American people of English descent
American people of Irish descent
American people of Scottish descent
American politicians of Salvadoran descent
American politicians of Lebanese descent
American politicians of Palestinian descent
American people of Greek descent
Harvard Business School alumni
Hispanic and Latino American members of the United States Congress
Living people
MIT School of Engineering alumni
Politicians from Boston
Republican Party members of the United States House of Representatives from New Hampshire
Republican Party United States senators from New Hampshire
Sununu family